This is a list of representative peers elected from the Peerage of Scotland to sit in the House of Lords after the Acts of Union 1707 abolished the Parliament of Scotland, where, as a unicameral legislature, all Scottish Peers had been entitled to sit.

From 1707 to 1963 there were sixteen Scottish representative peers, all elected from among the peerage of Scotland to sit for one parliament. After each dissolution of parliament, a new election of representative peers from Scotland took place, although the Irish representative peers held their seats in parliament for life.

Under the Peerage Act 1963 which came into effect in August that year, all Scottish peers were given seats in the House of Lords as of right, thus after that date no further Scottish representative peers were needed.

List of Scottish representative peers

1707–1749

1750–1799

1800–1849

1850–1899

1900–1949

1950–1963

Representative peers with a title in the Peerage of Great Britain or the Peerage of the United Kingdom

Since the Act of Union 1707

Since the Act of Union 1801

See also
List of elections of Scottish representative peers
List of Irish representative peers

References

 
Lists of Scottish parliamentarians